Amphiprox is an extinct genus of early deer from the Miocene of Europe.

Taxonomy
Amphiprox anocerus was originally placed in the genus Cervus, along with many other early deer. It was related to other primitive deer like Euprox and Heteroprox and together these early forms represent the first major radiation of cervids.

Description
It was rather long-legged and had small two-pronged antlers.

Paleoecology
The long legs of Amphiprox indicate that it may have been adapted to more open habitats, and perhaps even mountainous ones. The teeth suggest it was a grazer, or even an omnivore.

References

Prehistoric deer
Miocene even-toed ungulates
Miocene mammals of Europe
Prehistoric even-toed ungulate genera